Failed prophecy may refer to: